Tijana is a feminine given name of Serbian origin, also popular in North Macedonia.

Etymology
Tijana is the definition of perfect. It also means princess, peaceful and graceful.

People
Tijana Ajduković (born 1991), Serbian basketball player
Tijana Arnautović (born 1986), Serbian-Canadian model
Tijana Bogdanović (born 1998), Serbian taekwondo athlete
Tijana Bogićević (born 1981), Serbian singer
Tijana Bošković (born 1997), Serbian volleyball player
Tijana Todevska-Dapčević (born 1976), Macedonian-Serbian pop singer
Tijana Malešević (born 1991), Serbian volleyball player
Tijana Milojević (born 1998), Serbian volleyball player

Serbian feminine given names